Epermenia caledonica is a moth in the family Epermeniidae. It was described by Reinhard Gaedike in 1981. It is found in New Caledonia.

References

Epermeniidae
Moths described in 1981
Moths of Oceania